Amphoe Mueang Sa Kaeo is the capital district (amphoe mueang) of Sa Kaeo province, eastern Thailand.

Geography
Neighboring districts are (from the north clockwise) Khon Buri of Nakhon Ratchasima province, Watthana Nakhon and Khao Chakan of Sa Kaeo, and Kabin Buri and Na Di of Prachinburi province.

The Sankamphaeng Range mountainous area is in the northern section of this district, within its forested hills at the boundary between Sa Kaeo and Prachinburi Province is the Pang Sida National Park.

History
In 1909 the minor district (king amphoe) Sa Kaeo was established as a subordinate of Kabinburi district. It was upgraded to a full district on 23 July 1958. When in 1993 the new province Sa Kaeo was created, the district became the capital district of the province and was therefore renamed Mueang Sa Kaeo.

Administration
The district is divided into eight sub-districts (tambons), which are further subdivided into 124 villages (mubans). Sa Kaeo itself has town status (thesaban mueang) and covers parts of tambons Sa Kaeo and Tha Kasem. There are also two sub-district municipalities (thesaban tambons): Tha Kasem and Sala Lamduan both covering parts of the same-named tambons. There are a further eight tambon administrative organizations (TAO).

Missing numbers are tambon now forming Khao Chakan District.

References

External links
amphoe.com (Thai)

Mueang Sa Kaeo